"Alone in the Endzone" was a single released by the Australian punk rock band Radio Birdman, the only single from their  album Living Eyes. The distorted and original-sounding solo in the single's A-side, "Alone in the Endzone" is often mistakenly attributed to the lead guitarist Tek, but it was actually played by Chris Masuak. Tek played the rhythm part on the song.

Track listing
"Alone In The Endzone"
"Breaks My Heart"

Personnel
Warwick Gilbert - bass guitar
Ron Keeley - drums
Pip Hoyle - organ and piano
Chris Masuak - guitar and harmonies
Deniz Tek - guitar and harmonies
Rob Younger - lead vocals

References

1980 singles
1978 songs
Warner Music Group singles